Beness Khristoferovich Aijo (born 8 June 1979), also known by his nickname "Black Lenin", is a National Bolshevik activist of Russian and Ugandan descent. He has been active in the National Bolshevik movement since 1998 and has been repeatedly arrested and imprisoned for his political activities in various countries.

Born in the Latvian city of Rēzekne, Aijo spent most of his early life in Latvia before moving to the United Kingdom to pursue his master's degree at Birkbeck College, University of London. He joined the Communist Party of Great Britain (Marxist–Leninist) during his time in London and participated in many of the party's demonstrations.

In 2014, Aijo travelled to Crimea to support the Russian annexation of the peninsula. He later participated in pro-Russian demonstrations in the Donbas before being arrested by Ukrainian authorities and deported to Latvia. Aijo fled Latvia in 2015 despite being under criminal investigation and police surveillance. He eventually made his way to the Luhansk People's Republic, where he joined The Other Russia's paramilitary group, the Interbrigades. He later received a passport from the Donetsk People's Republic, which he used to enter Russia in early 2020. The Russian government granted Aijo political asylum in October 2020 and Russian citizenship in December 2022. The Latvian government revoked Aijo's Latvian citizenship in response to the latter.

Biography

Early life and activism
Beness Aijo was born in Rēzekne, Latvian SSR, Soviet Union. His father is Ugandan and his mother is Russian. He studied biology at the University of Latvia. He is an Orthodox Old Believer.

On 7 May 2005, Aijo was arrested for setting off smoke bombs during the visit of George W. Bush to Latvia. Later that year, Aijo was arrested and sentenced to 9 months in prison for calling for the overthrow of Latvia's political system. In prison, Aijo subsequently went on a hunger strike that lasted for 27 days until his health deteriorated enough to require hospitalisation. After spending five and a half months in jail, his security measure was changed from imprisonment to police surveillance at Aijo's request, when he cited his diabetes.

Thereafter, Aijo left Latvia and moved to London in the United Kingdom. He studied Medical Microbiology at the University of London, Birkbeck. Later in London, Aijo worked as a construction worker at the Heathrow Terminal 2. He played an active role in political rallies in the UK, where he was a member of the Communist Party of Great Britain (Marxist–Leninist).

From May–June 2013 he was in Palestine, where he took part in actions against the Israeli government. While in Palestine Aijo received medical training in the field.

On 14 September 2013, in Moscow, Aijo participated in the congress of the political party The Other Russia. On 19 November 2013, Aijo participated in London in a direct action in memory of Aleksandr Dolmatov. On 29 November 2013, he organized in The Hague further direct action in memory of Dolmatov. Beness was arrested and spent six weeks in a Dutch prison.

Involvement in pro-Russian unrest in Ukraine 
Aijo departed for Crimea in 2014. He was arrested in Donetsk on 1 April 2014 for "preparation of an armed coup to overthrow the government and to undermine the territorial integrity of Ukraine" and deported to the United Kingdom, where Aijo took part of demonstrations for a couple of weeks.

In May 2014, despite the ban from entering the country for three years, Aijo attempted to cross into Ukraine together with two more activists. He was detained by the Ukrainian Border Guard, and deported to Latvia, where he was detained by the Security Police and the State Police at Riga Airport. Aijo made claims he had been tortured and beaten by the Ukrainian National Guard.

On 16 May 2014, the Riga Central District Court ordered Aijo taken into custody and the Security Police commenced criminal prosecution for incitement to violently overthrow the government of Latvia, to change the political system, and to liquidate Latvian national independence. On the night to 30 May petards and smoke grenades were thrown at the Latvian general consulate in St. Petersburg by members of the far-left The Other Russia party, who set up a Soviet flag on the façade of the building, distributed pamphlets and demanded release of Aijo.

Aijo has participated in several demonstrations in Riga since, including the 15 August demonstration against Latvia's foreign policy towards Russia and to call for the dismissal of Minister of Foreign Affairs Edgars Rinkēvičs.

In early 2015, with an ongoing criminal case and while being under police surveillance Aijo fled Latvia by hitch-hiking to Tallinn, where he took a ferry to Finland and then traveled to Russia by bus, eventually arriving in Eastern Ukraine. There he joined the armed forces of the self-proclaimed Luhansk People's Republic in what he described as "military-political work", i.e., writing articles for a local newspaper, but he also expressed a desire to undergo training and sign up for active service. Riga Central District Court subsequently launched a manhunt for Aijo.

Aijo later reported taking part in pro-Russian operations in Debaltseve and near Stanytsia Luhanska among other places and being promoted to sergeant, going from a gunner on an artillery howitzer to a member of a motorized infantry brigade. In the middle of April 2019, Aijo was declared a suspect by the Latvia's State Security Service in a case regarding illegal participation in the pro-Russian unrest in Ukraine.

In early 2020, Aijo entered Russia using a passport from the unrecognised Donetsk People's Republic. He was later detained in Yarensk, Arkhangelsk Oblast, where Aijo was planning to take part in a protest against the construction of a garbage landfill. The Latvian Prosecutor General's Office requested his extradition to Latvia, while Aijo asked Vladimir Putin for political asylum in Russia. Aijo was released from prison in February 2020 and granted political asylum in Russia in October.

Aijo joined the Communist Party of the Russian Federation some time after 2020, according to the party's website.

On 17 May 2021, a Latvian court in Riga found Aijo guilty of "calling for the violent overthrow of the government, the liquidation of Latvian independence, and the undermining of the territorial integrity of Latvia". He was sentenced in absentia to two years and six months in prison, as well as one year of probation.

In December 2022, Aijo was granted Russian citizenship. On 6 February 2023, the Latvian Citizenship and Migration Affairs Office revoked Aijo's Latvian citizenship.

References

External links
 Aijo Beness on VKontakte
 "In Ukraine, foreigners fight for socialism and Greater Russia". An interview with National Bolshevik Beness Aijo. 

1979 births
Living people
People from Rēzekne
Russian people of Ugandan descent
National Bolshevik Party politicians
Communist Party of the Russian Federation members
Pro-Russian people of the 2014 pro-Russian unrest in Ukraine
Russian politicians
Russian communists
Russian Christians
Old Believers
Prisoners and detainees of Latvia
Prisoners and detainees of the Netherlands
Prisoners and detainees of Ukraine
Pro-Russian people of the war in Donbas
National Bolsheviks
Neo-Stalinists